European Parliament elections were held in the British Overseas Territory of Gibraltar (which formed part of the European Parliament constituency of South West England and Gibraltar) on 4 June 2009, with the results announced on 7 June 2009. The Conservatives won with 51% of the votes.  Turnout was 35% in Gibraltar, below the 39% for the electoral region as a whole. The turnout in the territory was significantly lower than the percentage from 2004, which was 58%.

Results

References

Gibraltar
European Parliament elections in Gibraltar
European
June 2009 events in Europe